Birmingham Grasshoppers were an American soccer team that played in Birmingham, Alabama from 1992 to 1996 as a member of the United States Interregional Soccer League. When the USISL split into two leagues in 1995, the Grasshoppers joined the Premier League. Preston Goldfarb (soccer coach at Birmingham-Southern College) was instrumental in originating the team and while at the helm, the Birmingham Grasshoppers won a division title, participated in the USISL "Sizzlin Nine" National Tournament, and hosted two regional playoffs. The Grasshoppers team was designed to give his players an opportunity to compete at a high level during the off-season, but travel schedules and time away from Birmingham-Southern led Goldfarb to discontinue the Grasshoppers after four seasons.

Year-by-year

Defunct soccer clubs in Alabama
Soccer clubs in Birmingham, Alabama
Association football clubs established in 1992
Association football clubs disestablished in 1996
1992 establishments in Alabama
1996 disestablishments in Alabama